Plandora is an open source tool to manage the software development process. It can be useful for teams that have problems with resource bottle-necks, parallel projects, workers in several projects at the same time, critical deadlines and project documentation demands.

History 
The project was made available at SourceForge in August 2004 with the system analysis documents almost finished and some source-code implemented (infra-structure classes, build files, libs, etc.)  under LGPL license (totally free for any purposes).

In 2008, the Plandora Project was presented at FISL9, the annual international open source forum at Porto Alegre.

In 2009, Plandora was mentioned by the itmanagement website as one of the 101 open source applications for Enterprise Business purposes and one of 10 open source project management systems.

See also
 Comparison of project management software
 Project management software

References

External links
 
 
 Plandora at SourceForge.net

Java (programming language) software